Aristote Madiani (born 22 August 1995) is a French footballer who plays as a winger for Iris Club de Croix.

Club career
Madiani is a youth exponent from RC Lens. He made his Ligue 1 debut at 7 December 2014 against Lille OSC replacing Boubacar Sylla after 79 minutes in a 1–1 home draw.

Personal life
Madiani is of Congolese descent.

Club statistics

References

External links
 
 
 

Living people
1995 births
French footballers
French expatriate footballers
France youth international footballers
French sportspeople of Republic of the Congo descent
Association football midfielders
RC Lens players
Paris FC players
US Quevilly-Rouen Métropole players
FC Vitosha Bistritsa players
Iris Club de Croix players
Ligue 1 players
Ligue 2 players
Championnat National players
Championnat National 2 players
Championnat National 3 players
First Professional Football League (Bulgaria) players
French expatriate sportspeople in Greece
French expatriate sportspeople in Bulgaria
Expatriate footballers in Greece
Expatriate footballers in Bulgaria
Black French sportspeople